Magnetized refers to the process of acquiring magnetism.

Magnetized or Magnetised may also refer to:
 Magnetized (album)
 "Magnetised" (song)